Hadrovci is a settlement in the Kotor Varoš Municipality, Republika Srpska entity, Bosnia and Herzegovina. According to the 2013 census the village had 181 inhabitants. Until 1955, Hadrovci belonged to the former Previle municipality.

Population

References

Sources
Vojnogeografski institut, Izd. (1955): Prnjavor (List karte 1:100.000, Izohipse na 20 m). Vojnogeografski institut, Beograd.

Villages in Republika Srpska
Populated places in Kotor Varoš